Susannah Stacey is a pseudonym used by writers Jill Staynes and Margaret Storey. Under this name, the team have produced a series of mystery novel featuring widowed British police Superintendent Bone. They also write a series of mysteries set during the Italian Renaissance under the name of Elizabeth Eyre.

Titles include 

 Goodbye Nanny Gray (1987)
 A Knife at the Opera (1988)
 Body of Opinion (1988)
 Grave Responsibility (1990)
 The Late Lady (1992)
 Bone Idle (1993)
 Dead Serious (1995)
 Hunter's Quarry (1998)

References 

British mystery writers
Women mystery writers
Collective pseudonyms
Pseudonymous women writers
20th-century British women writers
20th-century British novelists
British women novelists
20th-century pseudonymous writers